"Talkin' 2 Myself" is J-Pop singer-songwriter Ayumi Hamasaki's 42nd single, which was released on September 19, 2007. The single contains two rock tracks, one acoustic orchestra remix of her previously released "Fated", and the instrumentals of the main tracks. It is her 29th #1 single, breaking her own record for the most #1 singles by a solo female artist.  The drums in both Talkin' 2 Myself and Decision are played by Andy Selway from the band KMFDM.

Overview
"Talkin' 2 Myself" is Hamasaki's second single of 2007. It debuted at #1 on the daily charts with 26,267 copies sold in its first day. A week later it also debuted at #1 on the weekly charts with over 70,325 copies sold. This is Hamasaki's 17th consecutive #1 single and 29th #1 single. "Talkin' 2 Myself" sold 39,840 fewer copies than "Glitter / Fated" during its first week of sales, although Oricon stated that more people actually considered buying this single. This is Hamasaki's lowest first week sales for an original single since the release of "Love (Destiny)" in 1999, which sold 70,540 copies during its first week. However, "talkin' 2 myself" still managed to outsell the #2 single ("Shine / Ride On" by TVXQ) by 36,634 copies. "talkin' 2 myself" stayed on the top 30 Oricon chart for four weeks.

Music videos
In the PV for Talkin 2 Myself, Ayumi takes on an edgy, punk rock persona. The music video is set in a desolate urban area where it features Ayumi and her crew dancing.

The PV for Decision features Ayumi and her band dressed in black and performing onstage for a blank audience.

Track listings
CD Single

 "Talkin' 2 Myself" "Original mix"
 "Decision" "Original mix"
 "Fated" "Orchestra version"
 "Talkin' 2 Myself" "Original mix -Instrumental-"
 "Decision" "Original mix -Instrumental-"

DVD
 "Talkin' 2 Myself" (PV)
 "Decision" (PV)

Release history

Live performances
September 14, 2007 - Music Station
September 22, 2007 - Music Fighter
September 22, 2007 - Music Japan
September 30, 2007 - CDTV
October 5, 2007 - Music Station

Charts

Oricon Sales Chart (Japan)

Total sales :  130,000 (Japan)
Total sales :  160,630 (Avex)

 RIAJ certification: Gold

Digital sales charts

References

Ayumi Hamasaki songs
2007 singles
Oricon Weekly number-one singles
Songs written by Ayumi Hamasaki
2007 songs
Avex Trax singles
Song recordings produced by Max Matsuura